HIFA or Healthcare Information For All is a global healthcare information network

HIFA may also refer to:
 Harare International Festival of the Arts
 Hubei Institute of Fine Arts